"WTF?" is an alternative rock song by OK Go from their third studio album Of the Blue Colour of the Sky (2010). It was written by Damian Kulash, produced by Dave Fridmann and released as the album's first single. The song is in  time, and the band has revealed that the song was inspired by Prince.

Track listing
Digital download
 "WTF?" – 3:24
 "WTF?" (video) – 3:31

Music video
An accompanying music video was released at the same time as the single, co-directed by OK Go and Tim Nackashi. The entire video was made using a delayed image effect, and contains many psychedelic themes. All of the props in the video, such as Wiffle ball bats, gaffer tape, and beach balls, were bought from a 99 cent store. As is typical for OK Go videos, it was shot in one continuous take.

References

External links

2009 singles
OK Go songs
Songs written by Damian Kulash
Capitol Records singles
2009 songs